The History of Civilization is a boxed set of science fiction novels by author Edward E. Smith, Ph.D.  It contains the six novels of Smith's Lensman series. The set was published in 1961 by Fantasy Press in an edition of 75 copies.  Each volume was printed from the original Fantasy Press plates, but with a new title page giving the name of the set.  They were bound in red half-leather, numbered and signed by Smith.

Contents
 Volume 1 Triplanetary
 Volume 2 First Lensman
 Volume 3 Galactic Patrol
 Volume 4 Gray Lensman
 Volume 5 Second Stage Lensmen
 Volume 6 Children of the Lens

Reprints
Old Earth Books reprinted the set in 1998 in a limited edition of 100 copies, bound in leather with a slipcase.

References

 

1961 American novels
Novels by E. E. Smith
1961 science fiction novels
Fantasy Press books